The 2019 Grand Prix de Denain – Porte du Hainaut was the 61st edition of the Grand Prix de Denain one-day road cycling race, held annually around the town of Denain in northern France. Since 2018, the race has traversed several sectors of cobbled roads, including one used in Paris–Roubaix. The Grand Prix de Denain was ranked 1.HC in the 2019 UCI Europe Tour, and it was the second race in the 2019 French Road Cycling Cup series.

Dutch rider Mathieu van der Poel, of the  team, won the race. Kirsch and Räim were caught by the peloton, and Marc Sarreau of  won the reduced bunch sprint for second place.

Teams
Twenty-two teams competed in the 2019 Grand Prix de Denain, including three UCI WorldTeams, fifteen UCI Professional Continental teams, and four UCI Continental teams.

Result

References

External links
 
 

2021
2019 in French sport
2019 UCI Europe Tour
September 2019 sports events in France